The Yard Theatre is a theatre and music venue in a converted warehouse in Hackney Wick in the London Borough of Tower Hamlets. It programmes theatre and performance, late-night music events, and manages two community centres where it runs work with young people and its local community.

History
The Yard was founded by Artistic Director Jay Miller in 2011, with support from Tarek Iskander, Sasha Milavic Davies and Alex Rennie. They worked with architectural firm Practice Architecture to convert a disused warehouse into a theatre and bar. Originally intended to have a 3-month life-span, The Yard became an Arts Council England National Portfolio Organisation in 2017. In 2016 it took over management of Hackney Wick community centre Hub67, and in 2019 took on The Hall in East Village, London Borough of Newham.

Awards
The Yard was awarded the final Peter Brook Empty Space Award in 2017, as well as the Dan Crawford Innovation Award in 2012.

Programme
Shows that originated at The Yard include Michaela Coel’s Chewing Gum Dreams, which later transferred to the National Theatre and became the hit BBC show Chewing Gum (TV series). Its successful late-night music programme has been featured in national press,  and in the New York Times.

Recent theatre productions include a gender-swapped production of Arthur Miller's The Crucible, the premiere of Pulitzer Award-winning writer Clare Barron’s Dirty Crusty, and an entirely digital day of online performance, Yard Online. From March 2020 The Yard took all of its community and young people's work online in response to the COVID-19 pandemic.

References 

Music venues in London
Music venues completed in 2011
Theatres in the London Borough of Hackney
Hackney Wick